None may refer to:
Zero, the mathematical concept of the quantity "none"
Empty set, the mathematical concept of the collection of things represented by "none"
none, an indefinite pronoun in the English language

Music
None (Meshuggah EP), a 1994 EP by Swedish heavy metal band Meshuggah
None (Cloak of Altering EP), a 2013 EP by Dutch group Cloak of Altering

Other uses
None (liturgy), the ninth hour of the traditional Christian liturgy
None, Piedmont, a commune in the province of Turin in the Italian region of Piedmont
Irreligion, a lack of religious affiliation
None of the above, a political expression for rejecting all available candidates

See also
Nones (disambiguation)
Nothing (disambiguation)
Zero (disambiguation)
Nun (disambiguation)
Nunn (disambiguation)